Omobranchus smithi is a species of combtooth blenny found in the western Pacific and Indian ocean.

Etymology
The specific name honours the South African chemist and ichthyologist James Leonard Brierley Smith (1897-1968).

References

smithi
Taxa named by Visweswara Rao
Fish described in 1974